The 1925 Richmond Spiders football team was an American football team that represented the University of Richmond as an independent during the 1925 college football season. Led by 12th-year head coach, Frank Dobson, the Spiders compiled a record of 3–6. Richmond played their home games at Mayo Island Park on Mayo Island.

Schedule

References

Richmond
Richmond Spiders football seasons
Richmond Spiders football